Ar-Ruays, also spelled Al Ruwais, is a port town in the municipality of Al Shamal in Qatar. Before the country's economic landscape was transformed from oil extraction, Al Ruwais was one of the most important fishing centers on the peninsula.

The town is best known for Al Ruwais Port, the second-most important port in Qatar.

Etymology
Ar Ru'ays translates to 'small head' in Arabic. It was so named because the town juts out into the sea relative to the land surrounding it.

History

19th century
In the 1820s, George Barnes Brucks carried out the first British survey of the Persian Gulf. He recorded the following notes about Al Ruwais, which he referred to as Rooes:

A survey conducted by the British Hydrographic Office in 1890 describes Al Ruwais as "a small town on the mainland, 2 ½ miles south of Ras Rakan; it has four towers on the fort, which is the first thing seen from the northward when making the land. They have many boats, which run in over the reef, and anchor in shelter close to the beach. The fort is visible 6 or 7 miles".

20th century
At the start of the 20th century, Al Ruwais was described as such in J.G. Lorimer's Gazetteer of the Persian Gulf:

In an earlier 1904 transcript of Lorimer's Gazetteer, he remarks that before 1856, roughly 100 inhabitants of the Bu Kuwara and Utub tribes resided in Al Ruwais, reiterating the details in G.B. Bruck's earlier survey.

Al Ruwais became the second settlement outside of the capital Doha to construct a formal school in 1954. Throughout the 20th century it was considered the educational nucleus of northern Qatar.

After Qatar earned its independence in 1971, Sheikh Khalifa bin Hamad Al Thani assumed control of the newly-found state in February 1972. One of his main policies was the decentralization of Qatar's housing and major infrastructure projects. To promote growth in the northern settlements, he designated Al Ruwais a 'township' and launched several projects in it, including in 1972 the construction of the Al Ruwais Port.

Geography

Situated along the northern coastline, Al Ruwais is bordered by the villages of Madinat ash Shamal and Abu Dhalouf to the immediate west.

Al Ruwais' coastal area is a popular destination due to its lush vegetation. In recent years, the Ministry of Municipality and Environment have embarked on campaigns to restore the mangroves that grow abundantly on its coast. Roughly 13 hectares of coastal mangroves are found in Al Ruwais.

Climate 
The following is climate data for Ar Ru'ays obtained from Qatar Meteorology Department.

Historic architecture

Al Ruwais Mosque
One of the earliest harbor towns in Qatar, Al Ruwais accommodates what is believed to be the oldest surviving mosque in Qatar. Initially built around the 17th century, Ruwais Mosque was reconstructed in the 1940s. According to local tradition, the mosque was constructed at the behest of Ahmed Ezz el-Din bin Kassab Al-Sadah. After being struck by lightning in 1970, the minaret wall was reconstructed using seashell brick. As a result of the mosque’s worsening exterior condition, the Qatar Museums Authority launched a restoration project in 2014. From December 2014 to January 2015, archaeologists from the Qatar Museums Authority also excavated the eastern portion of the mosque, unearthing pottery shards, animal bones and coins. It is rectangular in shape, with an open courtyard, and can hold around 100 worshipers. The Ministry of Tourism and Al Shamal Municipality are coordinating to preserve the mosque and to promote it as a tourist attraction.

Al Ruwais Police Station
Erected in 1955 on a vacant partially isolated plot of land, the Al Ruwais Police Station previously served the city and its port. Besides enforcing laws and local ordinances, the police also served as a customs security for the port, of which it was in close proximity to. At present, the police station has been repurposed into a museum for finds from the nearby archaeological site of Ruwayda.

Visitor attractions

Al Ruwais is a popular birdwatching spot.

In May 2018, the Al Shamal Corniche was inaugurated in Al Ruwais. It features a -long promenade, 120 parking spots and 450 trees. Still to be developed facilities include a children's play area spanning .

Infrastructure
A government complex housing a Ministry of Justice office was opened in Al Ruwais in July 2014.

Al Ruwais Port

Ashghal (The Public Works Authority) announced in April 2009 that it would be accepting bids from contractors for three stages of construction on Al Ruwais Port, which would include a 10,000 square meter built up area. Another initiative to develop port infrastructure was the Al Ruwais Port development project, which had the stated aim of transforming Al Ruwais Port into northern Qatar's pathway to the world and was formally launched in January 2015 by Prime Minister Abdullah bin Nasser Al Thani. It was reported that, in June 2017, Al Ruwais Port had 57 ships with an overall capacity reaching 10,745 tons.

Mwani Qatar, the authority overseeing the port, established a 77,000 square meters truck parking lot with 285 spaces near Al Ruwais Port. It became fully operational in March 2018.

In December 2018, Mwani, the port authority, officially launched the second phase of the development project started four years prior. As part of this phase, it will undergo a 156,000 m² expansion, nearly tripling its capacity. It was announced that after the completion of the first phase, Al Ruwais Port was capable of exchanging up to 20,000 containers per year, up from 1,000 containers per year prior to the phase's completion. It is expected that by 2020 the port will have 300 additional berths.

Al Ruwais Port is a shallow-water port and can host small vessels up to 100 m LOA with max draft of 4.8 m.

References

External links

Populated places in Al Shamal
Populated coastal places in Qatar